Caspar is a masculine given name.

Caspar may also refer to:

 Caspar, California, a census-designated place
 Fort Caspar, Wyoming, a former US Army military post on the National Register of Historic Places
 CASPAR digital preservation project
 Azerbaijan Caspian Shipping Company, abbreviated as Caspar

See also 
 Caspar-Werke, a defunct German aircraft manufacturer
 Casper (disambiguation)